Tropidophoxinellus spartiaticus is a species of ray-finned fish in the family Cyprinidae.

It is found only in Greece.

Its natural habitats are rivers and intermittent rivers. It is threatened by habitat loss.

Sources

Tropidophoxinellus
Fish described in 1943
Cyprinid fish of Europe
Taxonomy articles created by Polbot